Chris Landreth (born August 4, 1961) is an American animator working in Canada, best known for his work on the 2004 film Ryan. He has made many CGI animated films since the mid-1990s, including The End, Bingo, The Listener, Caustic Sky: A Portrait of Regional Acid Deposition, and Data Driven The Story Of Franz K.

Life and career
After being an engineer for years, Chris quit and began a second career as an animator. He received a BS(1984) in General Engineering and a MS(1986) degree in Theoretical and Applied Mechanics at the University of Illinois. Three years following, he experimented in fluid mechanics research, until he made baby steps into the world of computer animation. Afterwards in 1994, he was hired to define, test, and sometimes even abuse computer graphics software products. Such products include "movie Grade" software, not limited to but including programs, such as Maya, from the Toronto-based animation firm, Alias (formerly Alias|wavefront, now owned by Autodesk).

This resulted in the productions of The End and Bingo. The End was nominated in 1996 for an Academy Award for Best Animated Short Film. Afterward, he met Ryan Larkin, a renowned animator in the 1960s and 1970s, who had recently fallen in a spiral of excessive drinking, cocaine abuse, and homelessness. This resulted in the 2004 production of Ryan, which won an Oscar in 2005.

Landreth's 2009 film The Spine won the Best of the Festival award at the Melbourne International Animation Festival. Produced by the National Film Board of Canada in association with Copperheart Entertainment, C.O.R.E. Digital Pictures and Seneca College, The Spine depicts a man who's physically and figuratively spineless and the breakdown of his marriage.

Subconscious Password was his  third with the NFB, Seneca College and Copperheart Entertainment. It won the best short film prize at the Annecy animation Festival 2013.

In 2016, he created the animated vignette Be Cool for the NFB satirical public service announcement series, Naked Island.

Landreth is currently an artist in residence at the Dynamic Graphics Project of University of Toronto. He is working on a feature-length adaptation of Hans Rodionoff, Enrique Breccia and Keith Giffen's graphic-novel biography of H.P. Lovecraft.

His films: Ryan, The Spine and Subconscious Password were included in the Animation Show of Shows.

Chris Landreth is a Master with The Beijing DeTao Masters Academy (DTMA), a high-level, multi-disciplined, application-oriented higher education institution in Shanghai, China.

"Psychorealism"
Chris Landreth uses standard CGI animation in his work, with the added element of what Chris calls Psychorealism. This often puts a surrealist styling into his work, notably The End, Bingo, The Spine, and Ryan. For instance, in Ryan,  peoples' psychological traumas are represented by twisted, surreal lacerations and deformities. As people depicted in the film get distraught, their faces distort. At one time in the interview Ryan gets so upset he literally flies apart.

Psychorealism is a style first put to words by Chris Landreth to refer to what Karan Singh described as, "the glorious complexity of the human psyche depicted through the visual medium of art and animation."

Awards and nominations

Sources
 Studio Daily
 Who's Who entry on Landreth
 Ohio State University

References

External links
 
 Watch Ryan at NFB.ca

1961 births
21st-century American engineers
Living people
Directors of Best Animated Short Academy Award winners
American animators
American animated film directors
Canadian animated film directors
Artists from Hartford, Connecticut
University of Illinois alumni
Directors of Genie and Canadian Screen Award winners for Best Animated Short
Computer animation people
Engineers from Connecticut